Soraya Alencar dos Santos (born 4 December 1958) more commonly known as Soraya Santos is a Brazilian politician as well as being a lawyer. She has spent her political career representing Rio de Janeiro, having served as state representative since 2015.

Personal life
Santos was born to Alan Guerra de Alencar and Cleyde Maria Guerra de Alencar. Before she became a politician Santos worked as a lawyer. Santos is married to politician Alexandre Santos.

Political career
Santos voted in favor of the impeachment motion of then-president Dilma Rousseff. Santos voted against a similar corruption investigation into Rousseff's successor Michel Temer. She voted in favor of the 2017 Brazilian labor reforms.

References

1958 births
Living people
People from Macaé
Brazilian women lawyers
Brazilian women in politics
Democratic Labour Party (Brazil) politicians
Brazilian Social Democracy Party politicians
Brazilian Democratic Movement politicians
Liberal Party (Brazil, 2006) politicians
Members of the Chamber of Deputies (Brazil) from Rio de Janeiro (state)
20th-century Brazilian lawyers